Four and Twenty Blackbirds is a 1937 picture book of nursery rhymes collected by Helen Dean Fish and illustrated by Robert Lawson. The book is a collection of nursery rhymes which were considered older when it was published. The book was a recipient of a 1938 Caldecott Honor for its illustrations.

References

1937 children's books
American picture books
Caldecott Honor-winning works